West of Carson City is a 1940 American Western film directed by Ray Taylor and written by Milton Raison, Sherman L. Lowe and Jack Bernhard. The film stars Johnny Mack Brown, Bob Baker, Fuzzy Knight, Peggy Moran, Harry Woods and Robert Homans. The film was released on January 19, 1940, by Universal Pictures.

Plot

Cast        
Johnny Mack Brown as Jim Bannister
Bob Baker as Nevada
Fuzzy Knight as Banjo
Peggy Moran as Millie Harkins
Harry Woods as Mack Gorman
Robert Homans as Judge Harkins
Al K. Hall as Lem Howard
Roy Barcroft as Bill Tompkins
Charles King as Drag
Frank Mitchell as Breed
Edmund Cobb as Sleepy
Jack Roper as Larkin
Ted Wells as Slim
Jack Shannon as Pete

References

External links
 

1940 films
American Western (genre) films
1940 Western (genre) films
Universal Pictures films
Films directed by Ray Taylor
American black-and-white films
1940s English-language films
1940s American films